Eva Vrabcová-Nývltová (born 6 February 1986) is a Czech cross country skier and marathon runner.

Cross-country skiing

She has competed at the top-level since 2005 in cross-country skiing. Competing in two Winter Olympics, she earned her best finish of 13th in the 4 x 5 km relay at Vancouver in 2010 while earning her best individual finish of 33rd in the individual sprint event at those same games.

Vrabcová-Nývltová's best finish at the FIS Nordic World Ski Championships was 37th twice, both at Sapporo in 2007 (10 km, 7.5 km + 7.5 km double pursuit).

Her best World Cup finish was ninth in a 4 × 5 km relay at Norway in 2007 while her best individual finish was 35th in a 10 km event also at Norway in 2009. She finished 6th in tour de ski in the 2014/15 season. In the overall FIS World Cup she finished 8th in 2014/15.

Cross-country skiing results
All results are sourced from the International Ski Federation (FIS).

Olympic Games

World Championships

World Cup

Athletics
Vrabcová-Nývltová competed for the Czech Republic in the marathon at the 2016 Summer Olympics in Rio de Janeiro. She finished in 26th place with a time of 2:33:51.

On August 12, 2018, Vrabcová-Nývltová won her first major athletics medal, finishing third in the marathon at the 2018 European Athletics Championships.

References

External links
 
 
 
 

1986 births
Cross-country skiers at the 2006 Winter Olympics
Cross-country skiers at the 2010 Winter Olympics
Cross-country skiers at the 2014 Winter Olympics
Athletes (track and field) at the 2016 Summer Olympics
Czech female cross-country skiers
Tour de Ski skiers
Czech female marathon runners
Living people
Olympic cross-country skiers of the Czech Republic
People from Trutnov
Olympic athletes of the Czech Republic
Universiade medalists in cross-country skiing
Universiade silver medalists for the Czech Republic
Competitors at the 2011 Winter Universiade
Athletes (track and field) at the 2020 Summer Olympics
Sportspeople from the Hradec Králové Region